Robert Kendal Muzzell (born 23 December 1945) is a South African former cricketer. He played in 75 first-class and 10 List A matches between 1964/65 and 1977/78.

See also
 List of Eastern Province representative cricketers

References

External links
 

1945 births
Living people
South African cricketers
Eastern Province cricketers
Gauteng cricketers
Western Province cricketers
People from Stutterheim
Cricketers from the Eastern Cape